Hopewell Township is an unincorporated community and former township in Greene County, Arkansas, United States. It lies at an elevation of 384 feet (117 m).

References

Unincorporated communities in Greene County, Arkansas
Unincorporated communities in Arkansas